Derbyshire County Cricket Club in 1910 was the cricket season when the English club Derbyshire had been playing for thirty nine years. It was their sixteenth season in the County Championship and they won two matches to finish fifteenth in the Championship table.

1910 season
Derbyshire played twenty two matches, all in the County Championship and won two and lost fourteen. Their two victories were courtesy of Leicestershire. John Chapman was in his first year as captain. Ernest Needham scored most runs, and Arthur Morton took most wickets.

Among the draws, the season produced one of the most memorable matches against Warwickshire at Blackwell in 1910 and not just a Derbyshire record 9th wicket partnership, but a world record 9th wicket partnership of 283 which still stands.  At lunch time on the last day Derbyshire with eight second innings wickets down, were far behind Warwickshire's first innings score and Warwickshire looked certain of a comfortable win. Chapman and Arnold Warren were batting. William Taylor wrote "In view of their strong position, Warwickshire, I knew, were hoping to catch an early afternoon train, and, in conversation during the interval, I remarked to their fast bowler, Frank Field: You look like catching your train all right, Frank. The reply was, I'm not so sure about that, Mr. Taylor. These chaps are pretty good bats, you know. How right he was. Chapman and Warren made their runs in less than three hours and Warwickshire had to be content with a draw." Chapman scored 165 and Arnold Warren 123.

Fred Root who became an international player and played five seasons for Derbyshire made his debut in 1910. Henry Jelf who retired from the navy played occasional games in this and the following season. Bertie Corbett, James Handford and Stanley Holden made their debuts and played a few games but only in the 1910 season. Charles Newcombe, who died in the war and Arthur Marsden who died six years later at St Pancras, played their only first class games in the season.

Matches

{| class="wikitable" width="100%"
! bgcolor="#efefef" colspan=6 | List of matches
|- bgcolor="#efefef"
!No.
!Date
!V
!Result 
!Margin
!Notes
|- 
|1
| 5 May 1910
|  Surrey Kennington Oval 
|bgcolor="#FFCC00"|Drawn
|
| W Smith 8–35; A Morton 6–71 
|- 
|2
|9 May 1910
|  Sussex   County Ground, Derby 
|bgcolor="#FF0000"|Lost
| 8 wickets
| A Warren 6–64 
|- 
|3
| 12 May 1910
 | Lancashire  North Road Ground, Glossop  
|bgcolor="#FF0000"|Lost
| 128 runs
| Huddleston 8–31; A Morton 5–69 
|- 
|4
|16 May 1910
| Essex   County Ground, Leyton 
|bgcolor="#FF0000"|Lost
| 4 wickets
| G Curgenven 100; Tremlin 5–42; Mead 6–71 
|- 
|5
|19 May 1910
|  Sussex   The Saffrons, Eastbourne 
|bgcolor="#FFCC00"|Drawn
|
| Cox 6–52; SWA Cadman 5–36; Relf 5–68 
|- 
|6
|26 May 1910
| Yorkshire Queen's Park, Chesterfield 
|bgcolor="#FF0000"|Lost
| Innings and 142 runs
| Rothery 134; Denton 182 
|- 
|7
|2 Jun 1910
| Kent County Ground, Derby 
|bgcolor="#FF0000"|Lost
| 304 runs
| Seymour 124; Hutchings 122; Blythe 6–36; A Warren 8–152; Wooley 5–35 
|- 
|8
|9 Jun 1910
|  Surrey County Ground, Derby 
|bgcolor="#FF0000"|Lost
| 10 wickets
| Hobbs 133; W Smith 7–36; A Warren 5–94; Lees 5–41 
|- 
|9
|18 Jun 1910
| Warwickshire  Miners Welfare Ground, Blackwell 
|bgcolor="#FFCC00"|Drawn
|
| Charlesworth 216; A Warren 123; J Chapman 165; Foster 5–62; 
|- 
|10
|25 Jun 1910
| Northamptonshire  Queen's Park, Chesterfield 
|bgcolor="#FF0000"|Lost
| 130 runs
| A Morton 5–142 and 5–76; Thompson 6–75 and 6–47
|- 
|11
|2 Jul 1910
| Leicestershire County Ground, Derby 
|bgcolor="#00FF00"|Won
| 6 wickets
| A Warren 6–59 
|- 
|12
|7 Jul 1910
| Kent  Bat and Ball Ground, Gravesend 
|bgcolor="#FF0000"|Lost
| 6 wickets
| Blythe 6–60 and 5–63; A Warren 5–71 
|- 
|13
|11 Jul 1910
| Leicestershire Aylestone Road, Leicester 
|bgcolor="#00FF00"|Won
| 42 runs
| E Needham 159; L Oliver 104; Coe 101; Jayes 6–72; A Morton 6–50 
|- 
|14
|14 Jul 1910
| Nottinghamshire  Trent Bridge, Nottingham 
|bgcolor="#FFCC00"|Drawn
|
| A Morton 7–90 and 5–150 
|- 
|15
|18 Jul 1910
| Hampshire County Ground, Southampton 
|bgcolor="#FF0000"|Lost
| Innings and 15 runs
| A Morton 7–144; Newman 7–77 
|- 
|16
|25 Jul 1910
| YorkshirePark Avenue Cricket Ground, Bradford 
|bgcolor="#FF0000"|Lost
| Innings and 101 runs
| Hirst 5–35; Booth 5–34; Rhodes 5–5 
|- 
|17
|1 Aug 1910
| Essex   County Ground, Derby 
|bgcolor="#FF0000"|Lost
| 271 runs
| A Morton 6–83; Buckenham 6–49 and 5–31; A Warren 5–86 
|- 
|18
|4 Aug 1910
| Warwickshire Edgbaston, Birmingham 
|bgcolor="#FF0000"|Lost
| 143 runs
| A Warren 5–81; Foster 6–65 and 6–51 
|- 
|19
|8 Aug 1910
| Hampshire Queen's Park, Chesterfield 
|bgcolor="#FF0000"|Lost
| 102 runs
| White 117; A Morton 8–117 
|- 
|20
|13 Aug 1910
| Northamptonshire  County Ground, Northampton 
|bgcolor="#FF0000"|Lost
| 6 wickets
| SWA Cadman 6–80; Wells 5–55 
|- 
|21
|18 Aug 1910
 | Nottinghamshire  Miners Welfare Ground, Blackwell 
|bgcolor="#FFCC00"|Drawn
|
| G Curgenven 109 
|- 
|22
|22 Aug 1910
 | Lancashire  Aigburth, Liverpool 
|bgcolor="#FFCC00"|Drawn
|
| 34 overs played for 38 runs 
|- 
|

Statistics

County Championship batting averages

County Championship bowling averages

Wicket-keeper
Joe Humphries Catches 35, Stumping 7

See also
Derbyshire County Cricket Club seasons
1910 English cricket season

References

1910 in English cricket
Derbyshire County Cricket Club seasons
English cricket seasons in the 20th century